Gujar Khan Railway Station (Urdu and ) is located in middle of the Gujar Khan city, Rawalpindi District of Punjab, Pakistan. The station is staffed and has booking office.

Train routes
The routes are Gujar Khan from linked to Karachi, Lahore, Quetta, Peshawar, Rawalpindi, Nowshera, Hyderabad, Sukkur, Attock, Bahawalpur, Nowshera, Rahim Yar Khan, Sargodha, Kotri, Jhelum, and Gujrat .

Train services from Gujar Khan

See also
 List of railway stations in Pakistan
 Pakistan Railways
 Rawalpindi Railway Station
 Lahore Railway Station
 Quetta Railway Station
 Peshawar Railway Station

References

External links

Railway stations in Rawalpindi District
Gujar Khan
Railway stations on Karachi–Peshawar Line (ML 1)